Toura     is a small town in the  Tyre District in  South Lebanon, located 9 kilometres northeast of Tyre.

Name
According to E. H. Palmer in 1881, the name Torah comes from "flowing water".

History
In 1875, Victor Guérin found here 450 Metawileh. He further noted that the village occupied "the summit of a hill entirely covered with fig-trees."

In 1881, the PEF's Survey of Western Palestine (SWP) described it: "A village of mud and stone, situated on the top of a hill, and surrounded by figs, olives, and arable land. There are a spring and cisterns. It contains about 200 Metawileh."

References

Bibliography

External links
  Toura, Localiban
Survey of Western Palestine, Map 1:  IAA, Wikimedia commons 

Populated places in Tyre District
Shia Muslim communities in Lebanon